Myrsine rivularis is a species of plant in the family Primulaceae. It is endemic to Peru.

References

Endemic flora of Peru
rivularis
Vulnerable plants
Taxonomy articles created by Polbot